Alaena exotica, the Jos Zulu, is a butterfly in the family Lycaenidae. It is found on the Jos Plateau of Nigeria. The habitat consists of rocky areas with tall grass.

The larvae feed on "blue-green algae" (cyanobacteria) growing on rocks.

References

Butterflies described in 2005
Alaena
Endemic fauna of Nigeria
Butterflies of Africa